"Forever" is a single by New Zealand rock band Six60. It was released as on 2 March 2012 as the fourth single from their self-titled debut studio album. It reached number 13 on the New Zealand Singles Chart

Track listing
Digital single
 "Forever" – 5:13
 "Forever" (Radio Edit) – 4:19

Digital EP
 "Forever" (Movie Version) – 3:24
 "Forever" – 3:55
 "Forever" (Vandertone Alternative Mix) – 3:18
 "Forever" (Peer Kusiv Remix) – 6:18
 "Run for It" – 5:00

Chart performance
"Forever" debuted on the RIANZ charts at number 31 and peaked at number 13.

Charts

Release history

References

2011 songs
2012 singles
Six60 songs